Manhattan Parade  is a 1931 American pre-Code musical comedy film photographed entirely in Technicolor. It was originally intended to be released, in the United States, early in 1931, but was shelved due to public apathy towards musicals. Despite waiting a number of months, the public proved obstinate and the Warner Bros. reluctantly released the film in December 1931 after removing all the music. Since there was no such reactions to musicals outside the United States, the film was released there as a full musical comedy in 1931.

The film pokes fun at Al Jolson, who had suffered a downturn in his career due to the public aversion to musical pictures. He had been released from his contract to Warner Bros. late in 1930.

Cast
Winnie Lightner as	Doris Roberts
Charles Butterworth as Herbert T. Herbert
Joe Smith as Lou Delman of the Avon Comedy Four (as Smith)
Charles Dale as Jake Delman of the Avon Comedy Four (as Dale)
Dickie Moore as Junior Roberts
Bobby Watson as Paisley
Frank Conroy as Bill Brighton
Walter Miller as John Roberts
Mae Madison as Woman in charge of fitting
Polly Walters as Telephone girl
Luis Alberni as Vassily Vassiloff
Greta Granstedt as Charlotte Evans
Lilian Bond as Sewing girl

Cast notes
This was the first of two films which the comedy team of Smith and Dale starred in for Warner Bros., the second being The Heart of New York. The team failed to be the success which Warner Bros. had hoped for and their contract was not renewed.

Production
The film was the first Warner Bros. film to be filmed in the improved Technicolor process which removed grain and improved both the color and clarity of the film. This improved process had first been used on The Runaround (1931) and resulted in an attempt at a color revival by the studios late in 1931. Variety praised the color work in this film, stating that "the coloring is easy on the eye and never harsh or confusing as the early color pictures were."

Music
Three songs were written for the film by Harold Arlen and Ted Koehler:
"I Love a Parade" (Production Number sung by Chorus)
"Temporarily Blue" (Sung by Winnie Lightner)
"I'm Happy When You're Jealous" (Sung by Winnie Lightner).  It was later recorded by Isham Jones and his Orchestra for Brunswick Records (Record Number 6204).

Preservation
Only a black and white copy of the cut print released in 1931 in the United States seems to have survived. A print is deposited at the Library of Congress. The complete film was released intact in countries outside the United States where a backlash against musicals never occurred. It is unknown whether a copy of this full version still exists. According to the George Eastman Museum 2015 book The Dawn of Technicolor, 1915-1935 a 16mm safety color print (ca. 3200 ft) is held at UCLA.

See also
List of early color feature films

References

External links
 
 
 

1931 films
1931 musical comedy films
1930s color films
American musical comedy films
1930s English-language films
American films based on plays
Films directed by Lloyd Bacon
Films set in New York City
Warner Bros. films
Films with screenplays by Robert Lord (screenwriter)
Early color films
1930s American films